Andrej Lukošík (born October 5, 1947 in Levoča) is a Czechoslovak/Slovak handball player who competed for Czechoslovakia in the 1972 Summer Olympics.

He was part of the Czechoslovak team which won the silver medal at the Munich Games. He played four matches including the final and scored one goal.

External links
 
 

1947 births
Living people
Czechoslovak male handball players
Slovak male handball players
Olympic handball players of Czechoslovakia
Handball players at the 1972 Summer Olympics
Olympic silver medalists for Czechoslovakia
Olympic medalists in handball
Medalists at the 1972 Summer Olympics
People from Levoča
Sportspeople from the Prešov Region